The Computer Science Department  at Stanford University in Stanford, California, is a leading school for computer science.  It was founded in 1965  and has consistently been ranked as one of the top computer science programs in the world.  Its location in Silicon Valley makes it unique among computer science programs.

History
The Stanford University Computer Science Department was founded in 1965 by George Forsythe.

Academics

The CS department grants B.S., M.S., and Ph.D. degrees.

Gates Computer Science Building

The Gates Computer Science Building, or "Gates Building" houses the Computer Science Department as well as the Computer Systems Laboratory. It also houses 550 faculty, staff and students. The building was named after Bill Gates, who donated $6 million of its total cost of $38 million. It was constructed over two years and completed in 1996.

People

Alumni
Brian Acton, co-founder of WhatsApp
Sergey Brin, co-founder of Google
Orkut Büyükkökten, founder of Orkut
Will Harvey, entrepreneur
Reed Hastings, Netflix founder
Jawed Karim, co-founder of YouTube
Larry Page, co-founder of Google
Blake Ross, co-creator of Mozilla Firefox
Mike Schroepfer, CTO of Facebook
David E. Shaw, hedge fund manager, D. E. Shaw & Co.
Charles Simonyi, inventor of Microsoft Word, former chief architect at Microsoft
Kevin Systrom, co-founder of Instagram

Faculty
 Vinton Cerf, former faculty, Turing award-winning computer scientist
 Douglas Engelbart, Turing award-winning computer scientist, inventor of the computer mouse, former researcher, inducted into National Inventors Hall of Fame
 Edward Feigenbaum, Turing award-winning computer scientist, father of expert system, coinventor of Dendral
 Robert Floyd, former faculty, Turing award-winning computer scientist
 Gene Golub, former faculty, a leading authority in numerical matrix analysis, inventor of the algorithm for Singular Value Decomposition (SVD)
 David Gries, former faculty, prof emeritus at Cornell, first text on compilers, leader in programming methodology and CS education
 Leonidas J. Guibas, Allan Newell award-winning pioneer in data structures and geometric algorithms
 John L. Hennessy, pioneer in RISC, President of Stanford
 Sir Antony Hoare, former faculty, Turing award-winning computer scientist
 John Hopcroft, former faculty, Turing award-winning computer scientist
 Alan Kay, former faculty, Turing award-winning computer scientist
 John Koza, pioneer in genetic programming
 Daphne Koller, professor in CS, co-founder of Coursera
 Donald Knuth, professor emeritus, computer science pioneer, creator of TeX, author of The Art of Computer Programming, Turing award winner
 Barbara Liskov, the first woman earning a Ph.D in CS (from Stanford), Turing award-winning computer scientist
 Edward McCluskey, professor in EE, IEEE John von Neumann Medal winner
 John McCarthy, responsible for the coining of the term Artificial Intelligence, and inventor of the Lisp programming language and time sharing, Turing award winner
 Robert Metcalfe, former faculty, co-inventor of Ethernet, inducted into National Inventors Hall of Fame
 Robin Milner former faculty, Turing award-winning computer scientist
 Allen Newell Turing award-winning computer scientist
 Andrew Ng, faculty in CS, winner of 2010 IJCAI Computers and Thought Award
 John Ousterhout, faculty in CS, winner of Grace Murray Hopper Award
 Amir Pnueli  postdoc, Turing award-winning computer scientist
 Ronald Rivest former faculty, Turing award-winning computer scientist
 Raj Reddy, former faculty, Turing award-winning computer scientist
Eric S. Roberts, professor emeritus in CS, pioneer in introductory computer science education
 Tim Roughgarden, faculty in CS, winner of Grace Murray Hopper Award
 Arthur Samuel, former faculty, a pioneer in the field of computer gaming and artificial intelligence. The Samuel Checkers-playing Program appears to be the world's first self-learning program, and as such a very early demonstration of the fundamental concept of artificial intelligence (AI).
 Dana Scott former faculty, Turing award-winning computer scientist
 Robert Tarjan, former faculty, Turing award-winning computer scientist
 Sebastian Thrun director of Stanford AI LAB, team leader of Stanford driverless car racing team, whose entry Stanley won 2005 DARPA grand challenge.
 Jeff Ullman, professor in CS, IEEE John Von Neumann prize winner
 Niklaus Wirth former faculty, Turing award-winning computer scientist, inventor of the Pascal Programming Language
 Terry Winograd,  faculty in CS, winner of 2010 IJCAI Computers and Thought Award
 Andrew Yao, former faculty, Turing award-winning computer scientist
 William Yeager, inventor of multi-protocol internet router

See also
 Stanford Artificial Intelligence Laboratory

References

External links
 Stanford University Computer Science
 

Computer Science
Computer science departments in the United States